AAA Invades WrestleCon was a professional wrestling pay-per-view event produced by the Mexican promotion Lucha Libre AAA Worldwide (AAA). The event was held on March 31, 2022, and took place at the Fairmont Hotel in Dallas, Texas as part of the WrestleCon convention.

In the main event, Psycho Clown defeated Taurus. After the match, Psycho Clown was attacked by the returning Jeff Jarrett, who revealed that he was the leader of La Empresa. In other prominent matches, Laredo Kid defeated Bandido and Flamita in a three-way match to retain the AAA World Cruiserweight Championship, La Rebelión (Bestia 666 and Mecha Wolf 450) defeated Aero Star and Drago to retain the National Wrestling Alliance World Tag Team Championship, and Taya, Niño Hamburguesa, and Micro Man defeated Los Mercenarios (Rey Escorpión and La Hiedra) and Mini Abismo Negro in a Lumberjacks with Straps trios match.

Storylines
AAA Invades WrestleCon featured seven professional wrestling matches, with different wrestlers involved in pre-existing scripted feuds, plots and storylines. Wrestlers portrayed either heels (referred to as rudos in Mexico, those that portray the "bad guys") or faces (técnicos in Mexico, the "good guy" characters) as they engaged in a series of tension-building events, which culminated in a wrestling match.

Results

See also
2022 in professional wrestling

References

2022 in Texas
Events in Texas
Professional wrestling in Texas
April 2022 events in the United States